P is a 2005 Thai-language horror feature film directed by Paul Spurrier. It has been claimed to be the “first Thai film to be directed by a westerner”.

Plot
Whilst growing up in rural Thailand, a young orphan girl named Dau (Suangporn Jaturaphut) is taught the ways of magic by her grandmother. But when the grandmother falls sick, Dau is lured to Bangkok to find work so that she can buy medicine. She finds herself working in a go-go bar, and her journey from naiveté to maturity is swift. She uses the magical skills her grandmother taught her to her advantage, but in doing so makes enemies within the bar. As her magic gets darker, and the consequences increasingly horrific, she gradually loses control, and something evil takes over.

Cast
 Suangporn Jaturaphut as Dau/Aaw
 Shaun Delaney	as Rich Customer
 John Kathrein	as Customer
 Chartchai Kongsiri as Policeman
 Opal as Pookie
 Pisamai Pakdeevijit as Grandmother
 Supatra Roongsawang as New
 Narisara Sairatanee as May
 Amy Siriya as Mee

References

External links
 
 

2005 films
Thai-language films
Thai horror films
British horror films
2005 horror films
Films about magic
2000s British films